Antonio Del Prete (26 December 1934 – 17 October 2022) was an Italian lawyer and politician.

A member of the Italian Social Movement and the National Alliance, he served in the Senate of the Republic from 1983 to 1987 and the Chamber of Deputies from 1994 to 1996.

Del Prete died in Torricella on 17 October 2022, at the age of 87.

References

1934 births
2022 deaths
Italian Social Movement politicians
National Alliance (Italy) politicians
Social Alternative politicians
The Right (Italy) politicians
Italian lawyers
Senators of Legislature IX of Italy
Senators of Legislature XII of Italy
People from Taranto